The Breda Ba.82 was an Italian medium bomber prototype of the late 1930s; it was designed and built by the Breda company.

Design and development
The Breda company began design work on the Ba.82 high-speed medium bomber in 1937. It was a four-seat mid-wing twin-engine monoplane with retractable landing gear, powered by two 745-kilowatt (1,000-horsepower) Fiat A.80 RC 41 engines. It was armed with three 7.7-millimeter (0.303-inch) Breda-SAFAT machine guns. Breda constructed a single Ba.82 prototype, which it presented publicly for the first time at the Aeronautica di Milano ("Aviation Milan") air show in 1937.

Even before its first flight, the Ba.82 ran into trouble with the Italian Air Ministry, which after examining its design decided that it was outdated. However, the Ministry considered placing a small production order with Breda provided that the Ba.82s performance and flight characteristics could be improved enough to allow it to complete official trials successfully.

During company test flights, the prototype suffered from frequent engine problems, and the company was forced to make numerous alterations to it. The problems delayed official testing of the prototype until 1939. By that time, the Air Ministry had decided that a trimotor layout would be standard for Regia Aeronautica (Italian Royal Air Force) medium bombers, making the Ba.82 prototypes twin-engine design undesirable; moreover, by 1939 the prototype fell short of Regia Aeronautica requirements for maximum speed, range, and bombload. No production order for the Ba.82 materialized, and the single prototype was soon scrapped.

Specifications (Ba 82)

See also

Notes

References

External links

www.airwar.ru Ba.82 (Russian)
AR Aircraft Manuals Blueprints Video Publications: Breda Ba.82

Ba.082
1930s Italian bomber aircraft
Mid-wing aircraft
Aircraft first flown in 1937
Twin piston-engined tractor aircraft